DeLand station is a train station in DeLand, Florida, United States. It is served by Amtrak (the National Railroad Passenger Corporation). It is about three miles west of downtown DeLand, at the location formerly known as DeLand Junction. DeLand station was originally built in 1918, and stood across from the former Volusia County Fairgrounds. It is scheduled to be served by the SunRail commuter rail service in the future.

History

When the Jacksonville, Tampa and Key West Railroad (and later the Atlantic Coast Line Railroad) ran passenger service along the line, they also ran local passenger service to Downtown DeLand. The DeLand Spur, which begins immediately south of the DeLand Station (the northern turnout actually cuts across the DeLand Station passenger platform), runs three miles east to Downtown DeLand and terminated at the College Arms Hotel (a public housing high-rise with the same name currently occupies the site). The track ran several blocks east of the hotel to provide freight service to local businesses and was graded all the way to Lake Helen, where it would have connected to the Atlantic and Western Railway, but track was ultimately never laid past Downtown DeLand. The station was acquired by Amtrak and restored in 1988, although a second track at the station fell into disuse and has not been maintained properly since. Up until 2005, when it was truncated to New Orleans, the station also served as a stop for the Sunset Limited. 

In 2006, the station was rededicated following a $424,000 restoration undertaken through a partnership between Volusia County, Amtrak, and CSX Transportation; funding primarily came from the Florida Department of Transportation. Work included installation of a new roof and platform canopy, remodeling of the bathrooms, and painting of the building in historically appropriate colors. In 2007, the station received a Preservation Award from the Florida Trust for Historic Preservation.

Future SunRail service
DeLand station is planned to be the northern terminus of the planned SunRail commuter rail system. This will lead to resumed maintenance of the neglected second track along with other upgrades to the station. The station could also see the addition of a 184 space park and ride lot and a bus drop off area. The station could "spur economic development on the west end of the city, heading toward the St. Johns River".

References

External links

DeLand Amtrak Station and Downtown Spur (USA Rail Guide — Train Web)
DeLand SunRail Station Concept
DeLand SunRail Station Redevelopment Plan

Amtrak stations in Florida
Former Atlantic Coast Line Railroad stations
Amtrak Thruway Motorcoach stations in Florida
Transportation buildings and structures in Volusia County, Florida
SunRail stations
DeLand, Florida
1918 establishments in Florida
Railway stations in the United States opened in 1918